Smoorverliefd may refer to:

Smoorverliefd, 2010 film by Belgian director Hilde Van Mieghem
Smoorverliefd, 2013 film, a Dutch version of film by Hilde Van Mieghem
"Smoorverliefd", a song by Dutch ska band Doe Maar 
"Smoorverliefd", 2020 song by Dutch rapper Snelle produced by Donda Nisha